The Norrington Table is an annual ranking of the colleges of the University of Oxford based on a score computed from the proportions of undergraduate students earning each of the various degree classifications based on that year's final examinations.

Overview 
The rankings of each college in the Norrington Table are calculated by awarding 5 points for a student who receives a First Class degree, 3 points for a 2:1, 2 for a 2:2 and 1 for a Third; the total is then divided by the maximum possible score (i.e. the number of finalists in that college multiplied by 5), and the result for each college is expressed as a percentage, rounded to 2 decimal places. Although the differences between the highest places on the table are usually slight, the top colleges remain very competitive about their rankings in the Table. Their competitiveness has been heightened in recent years by increased media attention towards the rankings.

Previously the university had refused to endorse an official table, leading to inaccuracies (see Criticisms below), so the university finally published its own rankings using examination results from all final year undergraduates in 2005.

History

Contrary to popular belief, the Norrington Table was not created in 1962 by Sir Arthur Norrington, who was then president of Trinity College.  Norrington did not invent the idea of producing a table of the results of Oxford colleges. Rather, he suggested a refinement to the weightings given to results in a existing table. Norrington's scoring system was suggested in 1963 and abandoned after 1985, owing to changes in the Oxford examination system.

On 5 September 1963, Norrington had a letter published in The Times, in which he objected to the table that their correspondent had published two days earlier (3 September 1963, p. 12). The Times had previously published a table of Oxford colleges' results in 1962 (29 August 1962, p. 5).

Norrington wrote: "Your Correspondent has analysed the final examination results this year and gives an order of merit, among the first colleges, based on the percentage of Firsts and Seconds.  This, in effect, is the same as basing it on the percentage of Thirds, and gives it no extra credit for Firsts.  College A, for example, that gets 20 Firsts, 60 Seconds, and 20 Thirds scores less by this method than College B that gets no Firsts, 81 Seconds and 19 Thirds, but surely A has, in reality, done much better than B.  A better result, I submit, is obtained by a points system in which a First scores more than a second and a Second more than a Third.  If you make the points 3, 2, and 1 respectively and calculate what percentage of its "possible" each college has secured, you will find that College A, with 200 points out of 300, has scored 66.67 per cent, and B, with 181, only 60 per cent.  This method of calculation will be found to promote Magdalen and Merton, which come surprisingly low in your Correspondent's order."  (5 September 1963, p. 13)

In 1986, when Oxford for the first time split Second Class honours into Upper Seconds and Lower Seconds, The Times unilaterally adopted the Tompkins Table, which gives more weight to a First class degree: five points for a First, three for a 2.1, two for a 2.2, and one for a Third. This system was devised in 1981 by Peter Tompkins, of Birkenhead, to classify the results of Cambridge colleges, and a table compiled by Tompkins on this basis was published on 28 August by The Times (28 Aug 1981, p. 10) alongside a table using the Norrington scoring system, which had been compiled by the Cambridge Evening News. The Tompkins Table became the preferred rating for Cambridge colleges and has prevailed for Oxford colleges as well since 1986.

Recent rankings 
Below is the Norrington Table for the academic year 2019/20 along with mean values for the period 2006 to 2019.

Past rankings 
Norrington Table rankings from 2006 to 2019 by college, ordered by mean rank, and omitting all PPHs since they take very few undergraduates,  with the exception of Regent's Park:

Criticisms 
The table is biased towards colleges with above average proportions of students in science subjects such as chemistry and mathematics, in which a higher proportion attain a first-class degree compared to humanities (in which more students attain a 2:1). The corresponding Tompkins Table at Cambridge makes an adjustment for this feature.

John Lucas, Fellow of Merton, presented a critique of the Norrington Table in a 1980 article titled "Norrington Blues".

Other tables and debate over use of Norrington name

The Norrington Table has inspired other tables ranking the performance of Oxford colleges, such as the “Vegetarian Norrington Table”, which was first published in 2016. A play on the original, the Vegetarian Norrington Table ranks the best and worst colleges in Oxford not for their undergraduate examination results, but for the quality of their vegetarian and vegan food, using data collected from staff and students of the University. The table caused some controversy, however, as a number of college bursars argued that it bore no relation to the original and further questioned its metrics. The current top-ranked college in the Vegetarian Norrington Table is Mansfield College, followed by Worcester College, with Kellogg College in third.

There have been attempts to rework the original Norrington Table, specifically in light of debates surrounding access and the equality of  process. In 2018, one article used geographical data to rank colleges based on the percentage of undergraduate students from poorer backgrounds. In this same report, the Vice President of the Oxford University Student Union announced work was underway on an “alternative Norrington Table” which would seek to measure social mobility as well as academic success in colleges.

References

1963 establishments in England
Culture of the University of Oxford
History of the University of Oxford
University and college rankings
Universities in the United Kingdom